Richard Osborne Ristine (January 19, 1920 – June 20, 2009) was an American politician from the U.S. state of Indiana. Between 1961 and 1965 he served as Lieutenant Governor of Indiana.

Life
Richard Ristine was born in Crawfordsville in Indiana. In 1941 he graduated from the Wabash College in that City. During World War II he served in the Army Air Corps in the Philippines and Japan, where he reached the rank of captain. Afterwards he studied law at the Columbia University. After his permission to the bar he started working as an attorney. He joined the Republican Party and in 1950 he was elected to the Indiana Senate. Ten years later he ran successfully for the office of the Lieutenant Governor of Indiana. He served in this position between 9 January 1961 and 11 January 1965 when his term ended. In this function he was the deputy of Governor Matthew E. Welsh and he presided over the State Senate. In this function he voted in favor of Indiana's first sales tax in 1963. In 1964 he ran unsuccessfully for the Governor’s office of Indiana.

After the end of his political career he continued his work as a Lawyer. He also became a Member of the boards of various companies and enterprises. He also was Chairman of the Indiana Historical Society. In 1990 he retired and moved to Leland in Michigan where he died on 20. June 2009.

External links
 

1920 births
2009 deaths
People from Crawfordsville, Indiana
Wabash College alumni
Columbia Law School alumni
Indiana lawyers
Republican Party Indiana state senators
Lieutenant Governors of Indiana
People from Leland, Michigan
20th-century American politicians
20th-century American lawyers